Pål Flåta (born 8 April 1968) is a Norwegian vocalist, known from the band Midnight Choir and as a solo artist.

Career 
Flaata was born in Skien, Norway.  He started his career in the Skien band Memphis News and has since then been involved in Paal & Pål Band with Pål Jensen, Carsten "Kesh" Holt, and Vidar Busk. In the early 1990s, Flaata traveled to Oslo along with two other musicians. There, they played hillbilly music on the street and were called the Hashbrowns. Then the band got a record deal, and went to the US to record an album. Hashbrowns was then transformed to Midnight Choir. Flaata was in the forefront of Midnight Choir, until the band was dissolved in 2004, and was involved in the outlet of five albums plus a compilation.

He debuted as a solo artist in 2002 with In Demand and continued as a solo artist after the dissolution of Midnight Choir. They were nominated for the Spellemannprisen 2012 for the album Wait by the Fire in the class Country.

In 2008, Flaata also participated on the children's record Magiske Kroker & Hemmeligheter produced by Linn Skåber and Jacob Young, with the song "Fredag". Other artists who participated were Simone Larsen, Maria Haukaas Storeng, Egil Hegerberg, Venke Knutson, Alejandro Fuentes, Julius Winger, Live Maria Roggen, Jørn Christensen, Alexander Rybak, and Andrea Bræin Hovig.

He has performed alongside Stephen Ackles and Vidar Bush. They have released a tribute album to Elvis, a Christmas album and a gospel album together. On the single "Come Tomorrow" from 2016, he sings with his daughter Maia Flaata.

Personal life 
He was married 20 July 2013, to Stine Sollie Flåta (b. Sollie 1988).

Discography

Solo albums 
2002: In Demand (Universal Music)
2005: Rain (S2 Records)
2006: Christmas Island (Grammofon)
2008: Old Angel Midnight (Wilma Records)
2012: Wait by the Fire - Songs of Chip Taylor (Rootsy)
2014: Bless Us All - Songs of Mickey Newbury
2016: Come Tomorrow - Songs of Townes Van Zandt

 2017: Love and Rain: The Athletic Sessions

Collaborations 
Within Midnight Choir
1994: Midnight Choir (Fjording)
1996: Olsen's Lot (S2 Records)
1998: Amsterdam Stranded (S2 Records)
2000: Unsung Heroine (Glitterhouse Records)
2002: Selected Songs (S2 Records)
2003: Waiting for the Bricks to Fall (S2 Records)
2005: All Tomorrows Tears: The Best of Midnight Choir (S2 Records)
With Stephen Ackles and Vidar busk

 2016: En storslått hyllest til Elvis!

 2017: I Wish Everyday Could Be Like Christmas! 
 2018: A Thing Called Love – The Gospel Album

References

External links 

Paal Flaata, "Bless us all" at YouTube
Paal Flaata – Releave me(sic) (encore) – Rockefeller, Oslo – 2011-12-04 at YouTube
Midnight Choir Biography at Store Norske Leksikon

Norwegian male singers
Norwegian pop musicians
Norwegian composers
Norwegian male composers
1968 births
Living people
Musicians from Skien